Ravine Gardens State Park is a  Florida State Park located in Palatka, Florida. It is listed on the National Register of Historic Places in 1999.

The park was constructed by the Works Progress Administration, with cypress buildings, rock gardens and fieldstone terraces. Near the park entrance is The Court of States and a  obelisk dedicated to Franklin D. Roosevelt.

Recreational activities
Activities include viewing the thousands of plants and shrubs, picnicking, jogging, hiking and biking. Amenities include interpretive exhibits, picnic areas, gardens, hiking trails, a  paved perimeter loop road, and a parcours trail. Visitors can rent a large covered pavilion, auditorium, and meeting rooms.

Special events
The park is part of the annual Florida Azalea Festival the first weekend in March, when the nearly 100,000 plants that the WPA planted decades ago bloom.

Hours
Florida state parks are open between 8 a.m. and sundown every day of the year (including holidays).

Gallery

References

External links
 Ravine Gardens State Park at Florida State Parks
 Ravine State Gardens at Absolutely Florida
 Ravine State Gardens at Wildernet
 Putnam County listings at National Register of Historic Places

State parks of Florida
National Register of Historic Places in Putnam County, Florida
Palatka, Florida
Tourist attractions in Palatka, Florida
Works Progress Administration in Florida
Protected areas established in 1934
Parks in Putnam County, Florida
Gardens in Florida
Parks on the National Register of Historic Places in Florida
1934 establishments in Florida
National Park Service rustic in Florida